Underneath My Skin may refer to:

"Underneath My Skin", song by Christina Undhjem Denmark in the Eurovision Song Contest 2009
"Underneath My Skin", song by In Flames from Battles (album)
"Underneath My Skin", song by Jonathan Davis from Black Labyrinth 2018